Macan is a surname and may be:

 Ana Carolina Reston Macan (19842006), Brazilian fashion model
 A.V. Macan (Arthur Vernon Macan, 18821964), Irish immigrant to Canada, golfer and golf course designer
 Darko Macan (born 1966), Croatian author and illustrator
 George Macan (18531943), Irish-born lawyer and cricketer in England
 Reginald Walter Macan (18481941), classical scholar and Master of University College, Oxford
 Tom Macan (born 1946), Governor and Commander-in-Chief of the British Virgin Islands
 T. T. Macan (191085), British entomologist
 Trpimir Macan (born 1935), Croatian historian and lexicographer
 Nicasio Macan (born 1895), World War II US Army Sergeant, Philippine Scouts

See also
 Porsche Macan, a German compact crossover SUV in production since 2014

de:Macan